Bosnia and Herzegovina competed at the 2005 World Championships in Athletics from 6 – 14 August 2005.

Results

Men
Field Events

See also
 Bosnia and Herzegovina at the World Championships in Athletics

References 

Nations at the 2005 World Championships in Athletics
World Championships in Athletics
2005